William Billingsley may refer to:
 William Billingsley (aviator) (1887–1913), American naval aviator, namesake of the USS Billingsley
 William Billingsley (artist) (1758–1828), English painter of porcelain